Life FM may refer to:

New Zealand
 Life FM (New Zealand), a Christian radio network

United States
 The Life FM, a Christian radio network

Australia
 Life FM (Adelaide), 5RAM, a radio station in Adelaide, South Australia
 Life FM (Gold Coast), 4CAB, a radio station on the Gold Coast, Queensland
 Life FM (Gippsland), 3GCB, a radio station in the Gippsland region of Victoria
 Life FM (Wagga Wagga), 2WLF, a radio station in Wagga Wagga, New South Wales
 Life FM (Bathurst), 2BCB, a radio station in Bathurst, Central Tablelands, New South Wales
 Life FM (Bendigo), Central Victorian Gospel Radio Inc. in Bendigo, Victoria

England
 a former name of Bang Radio, a radio station in Harlesden, London

South Africa
 Life FM (South Africa), a Christian community radio station based in the North West.